Mujigae-tteok or rainbow rice cake is a layered tteok (rice cake) of different colors resembling a rainbow. It is used for special occasions such as a banquet, party, or feast like doljanchi (first birthday), hwangapjanchi (60th birthday). Alternative names for mujigae-tteok include saektteok and saekpyeon, both of which means "colored rice cakes".

Preparation 
The addition of food coloring makes mujigae-tteok different from the other varieties of seolgi-tteok, such as white baek-seolgi. It is made by steaming sweetened non-glutinous rice flour in a siru (steamer). Sweetened rice flour is made by first grinding soaked rice and mixing it with honey or sugar solution. The flour is then rubbed between the palms for uniform mixing of the ingredients and finally sieved. Food colorings, commonly gardenia (yellow), rock tripe powder (grey), mugwort powder (green), and devil's-tongue powder (pink), are then added and mixed with small amount of water.

See also 
 List of Korean desserts
 List of steamed foods

References 

Steamed foods
Tteok